Joan Carroll (born Joan Marie Felt, January 18, 1931 – November 16, 2016) was an American child actress who appeared in films until retiring in 1945.

Childhood career

Carroll was born Joan Marie Felt to Wright and Freida Felt on January 18, 1931. 

Carroll developed into an excellent singer and tap dancer at the Fanchon and Marco Dancing School in Hollywood, and became an accomplished child actress. Her stage name was changed to Carol and then Carroll.

Between 1937 and 1940 she appeared in supporting roles in several movies. Her big break came the 1940 film, Primrose Path, as Ginger Rogers's younger sister, for which she won a Critics Award. The same year she became the first child star to be summoned from Hollywood in order to appear in the leading role in a Broadway musical, Panama Hattie, which ran from October 30, 1940 to January 3, 1942.

Carroll became RKO Radio Pictures' resident juvenile personality in both "A" and "B" pictures. RKO starred Carroll in the leading role with Ruth Warrick in two zany comedy vehicles, Obliging Young Lady (1941) and Petticoat Larceny (1943).
She continued to work in films as an adolescent, but less frequently. Two of her best-remembered pictures came from this period: Meet Me in St. Louis (1944) as Judy Garland and Margaret O'Brien's sister, and The Bells of St. Mary's (1945), in which she played "the sensitive child of separated parents."

Later life
After The Bells of St. Mary's in 1945, Carroll retired. In 1951, she married James Joseph Krack. 

She and her brother donated a historic family lamp to the Nevada State Museum on July 7, 2011. 

Carroll died on November 16, 2016 near her home in Puerto Vallarta, Mexico, aged 85. She was survived by her four children and extended family.

Filmography

Bibliography
 Best, Marc. Those Endearing Young Charms: Child Performers of the Screen. South Brunswick and New York: Barnes & Co., 1971, pp. 20–24;  /

References

External links

1931 births
2016 deaths
20th-century American actresses
Actresses from New Jersey
Singers from New Jersey
Actresses from California
Singers from California
American child actresses
American film actresses
American musical theatre actresses
21st-century American women